GGO may refer to:

 AI Football GGO, a Chinese television series
 Greater Greensboro Open, now the Wyndham Championship, an American golf tournament
 Ground-glass opacity
 Guiglo Airport, in Ivory Coast
 Sword Art Online Alternative Gun Gale Online, a Japanese light novel series.